Jasmine is an extinct town in Adair County, in the U.S. state of Missouri. The GNIS classifies it as a populated place, but the exact location of the town site is unknown.

A post office called Jasmine was established in 1880, and remained in operation until 1886. A variant name was Crawford.

References

Ghost towns in Missouri
Former populated places in Adair County, Missouri